Roland Carroll Jordan, Jr (born 1938) is an American composer and music theorist. He studied in Texas and Pennsylvania before receiving his Ph.D. from Washington University in St. Louis, where he taught theory and composition for three decades. As a composer, Jordan has written for both large ensembles and chamber groups, and as a music theorist, he has explored the uses of phenomenological methodology and structuralist/post-structuralist theory.

List of works 
 Times Space (encounters) for chorus and tape
 Maps, An Evening of Music (produced by the New Music Circle and Washington University, 1978)
 Sonata for Piano (commissioned by the NMC and written for John Phillips)
 Songs for Li Po (commissioned by River Stix)
 Except Perhaps a Constellation concerto, for flute and chamber orchestra
 Sonata for Violin and Viola and Years of the Plague, for chamber ensemble and pre-recorded tape (written for Synchronia)

List of publications 
 with Emma Kafalenos. "The Double Trajectory: Ambiguity in Brahms and Henry James." 19th-Century Music 13 (2) (Fall, 1989): 129-144.
 with Emma Kafalenos. "Spatial Aspects of Temporal Structure: The Effects of Ordering and Reordering in Mozart and E. T. A. Hoffmann." In Proceedings of the XIIth Congress of the International Comparative Literature Association, Munich 1988, IV: Space and Boundaries of Literature, 530-35. Munich: Iudicium, 1990.
 "Fold upon Fold: Boulez (and Mallarme)." Yearbook of Comparative and General Literature 1987-88-97.

References

External links
 New Music Circle

American male composers
21st-century American composers
American music theorists
Music of St. Louis
Washington University in St. Louis faculty
Washington University in St. Louis alumni
Living people
1938 births
21st-century American male musicians